Volvi (Vólvi) is a municipality in the Thessaloniki regional unit, Central Macedonia, Greece. The seat of the municipality is the town Stavros. The municipality has an area of 783.014 km2. It was named after Lake Volvi.

Municipality
The municipality Volvi was formed at the 2011 local government reform by the merger of the following 6 former municipalities, that became municipal units:
Agios Georgios
Apollonia
Arethousa
Egnatia
Madytos
Rentina

References

Municipalities of Central Macedonia
Populated places in Thessaloniki (regional unit)